Ramavarappadu Junction is one of the busiest chowks (roundabout / traffic circle) and a prominent landmark located on National Highway 16 in the Indian City of Vijayawada, Andhra Pradesh. Two highways NH16 and Vijayawada Inner Ring Road intersect at this junction.

Traffic
Ramavarappadu Junction is one of the Bussiest Junctions in Vijayawada. Green Loop of Vijayawada BRTS and Vijayawada Inner Ring Road meets with National Highway 16 at this Junction. Metro station will come up at the Ramavarappadu circle junction. The CRDA is planning to construct a big Arch at the Ramavarappadu ring junction to welcome the people who come from Eluru on the National Highway.

References 

Neighbourhoods in Vijayawada